Lanner is a surname of European origin.

Notable people
August Lanner (1835–1855), Austrian composer, son of Joseph Lanner
Baruch Lanner (born 1949), American Orthodox rabbi, who was convicted of child sexual abuse
Joseph Lanner (1801–1843), Austrian composer
Katti Lanner (1829–1908), Viennese ballet dancer and choreographer, daughter of Joseph Lanner
Mats Lanner (born 1961), Swedish golfer
Olle Lanner (1884–1926), Swedish gymnast
Sixtus Lanner (1934–2022), Austrian politician
Susi Lanner (1911–2006), Austrian actress

See also
 Lanner (disambiguation)